51st Regiment or 51st Infantry Regiment may refer to:

 51st Regiment of Foot (disambiguation), several units of the British Army
 51st Highland Volunteers, a unit of the British Army
 51st Infantry Regiment (United States)
 51st Armoured Regiment (India)
 51st Coast Artillery Regiment, a unit of the United States Army
 51st (Leeds Rifles) Royal Tank Regiment
 51st (Highland) Searchlight Regiment, Royal Artillery
 51st (London) Heavy Anti-Aircraft Regiment, Royal Artillery
 51st (Westmoreland and Cumberland Yeomanry) Field Regiment, Royal Artillery
 51st Sikhs (Frontier Force), a unit of the British Indian Army

Union Army (American Civil War):
 51st Illinois Infantry Regiment
 51st Indiana Infantry Regiment
 51st Regiment Massachusetts Volunteer Infantry
 51st New York Volunteer Infantry
 51st Ohio Infantry
 51st Pennsylvania Infantry Regiment
 51st Wisconsin Volunteer Infantry Regiment
 51st United States Colored Infantry Regiment

See also
 51st Division (disambiguation)